Jonathan I Rashleigh (4 July 1591 – 1 May 1675), of Menabilly, near Fowey in Cornwall, was an English shipping-merchant, Member of Parliament for Fowey in 1614, 1621, 1625, April 1640 and November 1640,  and 1661 and served as Sheriff of Cornwall in 1627. He supported the Royalist cause during the Civil War.

Family
He was the second son and heir of John Rashleigh (1554–1624), MP for Fowey in 1588. He married twice. His first marriage was on 17 December 1614, to Anne Basset (c. 1595 – 1631), eldest daughter of Sir Robert Basset (1573–1641) of Umberleigh and Heanton Punchardon in Devon, MP for Plymouth in 1593, by his wife Elizabeth Periam (1571–1635), the second daughter and co-heiress of Sir William Peryam, Lord Chief Baron of the Exchequer. By Anne he had five children including:
John Rashleigh (1621–1651), who pre-deceased his father, whose mural monument exists in Kenton Church. Devon. He married Joan Pollexfen (died 1668), daughter of John Pollexfen of Mothecombe, Devon, and was the father of Jonathan Rashleigh II (1642–1702), of Menabilly, many times MP for Fowey and Sheriff of Cornwall in 1687
Alice Rashleigh, wife of Sir Peter Courtney (c.1616 – 1670), MP, of Trethurfe, Cornwall.
Elizabeth Rashleigh, who married her cousin from the senior Cornwall line, John Rashleigh (1619–1693) of Coombe, Fowey, MP for Fowey in 1661

His second marriage was in 1633 to Mary Harris (died 1674), daughter of John Harris of Radford, near Plymouth, Devon.

Rashleigh died on 1 May 1675 and was succeeded by his grandson Jonathan Rashleigh (1642–1702), of Menabilly, many times MP for Fowey and Sheriff of Cornwall in 1687.

Career
Rashleigh was elected Member of Parliament for Fowey in 1614, 1621 and 1625. In 1627 he served as Sheriff of Cornwall.
In April 1640 he was re-elected MP for Fowey for the Short Parliament and re-elected in November 1640 for the Long Parliament.} He supported the King in the Civil War and was disabled from sitting in parliament in 1644. He was bankrupted by penalties imposed on his estate and imprisoned in St Mawes castle. His fortunes were repaired at the Restoration in 1660. He was elected once more MP for Fowey to the Cavalier Parliament in 1661 and sat until his death at the age of 83.

Notes

References

Further reading

1591 births
1675 deaths
Jonathan
People from Tywardreath and Par
Members of the pre-1707 English Parliament for constituencies in Cornwall
English MPs 1614
English MPs 1621–1622
English MPs 1625
English MPs 1640 (April)
English MPs 1640–1648
English MPs 1661–1679
High Sheriffs of Cornwall
17th-century merchants